Marion Kent (died 1500), was an English businessperson and property manager from York.

She inherited a merchant business from her spouse, who died in 1468. The business dealt in a variety of goods, including cloth, oil, iron (of which York Minster was a purchaser), and timber (some of which she supplied to the guild of Corpus Christi).  She belonged to the elite of her craft and sat on the council of the mercers guild in 1474–1475, a position highly unusual for a woman in that period.

References

1500 deaths
Year of birth missing
15th-century English businesspeople
15th-century English women
15th-century English people
People from York
English women in business
Medieval businesswomen
Businesspeople from Yorkshire